The 58th Regiment Illinois Volunteer Infantry was an infantry regiment that served in the Union Army during the American Civil War.

Service
The 58th Illinois Infantry was organized at Chicago, Illinois and mustered into Federal service on December 26, 1861.

The regiment was mustered out on April 15, 1866.

Total strength and casualties
The regiment suffered 8 officers and 75 enlisted men who were killed in action or mortally wounded and 4 officers and 211 enlisted men who died of disease, for a total of 298 fatalities.

Commanders
 Colonel William Francis Lynch - mustered out with the regiment.

See also
List of Illinois Civil War Units
Illinois in the American Civil War

Notes

References
The Civil War Archive

Units and formations of the Union Army from Illinois
1862 establishments in Illinois
Military units and formations established in 1862
Military units and formations disestablished in 1865